Zero Gravity (Rebirth and Evolution) is the only studio album by Italian symphonic metal band Turilli Lione Rhapsody. It was released on July 5, 2019 via Nuclear Blast. The album was funded by a crowdfunding campaign that the band had started on Indiegogo.

Unlike Rhapsody of Fire albums, which feature high fantasy narratives, Zero Gravity is not a concept album and its lyrics deals with scientific, spiritual and philosophical themes. Both Lione and Turilli say that the album represents a new artistic view of the band (hence the Rebirth and Evolution subtitle), by modernizing their sound without losing the original essence of Rhapsody's music.

Track listing

Personnel 
All information from the album booklet.

Band members
Fabio Lione – lead vocals, producer
Luca Turilli – lead and rhythm guitar, keyboards, producer
Dominique Leurquin – rhythm guitar, lead guitar
Patrice Guers – bass guitar
Alex Holzwarth – drums

Additional musicians
Elize Ryd (Amaranthe) – vocals on "D.N.A. (Demon and Angel)"
Mark Basile (DGM) – vocals on "I Am", choir vocals
Sascha Paeth – bass guitar on "Oceano"
Arne Wiegand – guitars, mandolin, piano on "Oceano"
Joost van den Broek – keyboards on "Oceano"
Emilie Ragni – backing vocals, choir vocals
Alessandro Conti – choir vocals

Production
Stefan Heilemann – cover art
Simone Mularoni – recording, mixing, mastering, rhythm guitars, guitar solos on "Fast Radio Burst" and "I Am"
Kristian Fyhr – recording

Charts

References

Luca Turilli albums
2019 debut albums
Nuclear Blast albums